The rock sparrow or rock petronia (Petronia petronia) is a small passerine bird in the sparrow family Passeridae. It is the only member of the genus Petronia. It breeds on barren rocky hills from the Iberian peninsula and western north Africa across southern Europe and through the Palearctic  Siberia and north and central China. It is largely resident in the west of its range, but Asian birds migrate to more southerly areas, or move down the mountains.

Taxonomy
The first formal description of the rock sparrow was by the Swedish naturalist Carl Linnaeus in 1766 in the twelfth edition of his Systema Naturae. He introduced the binomial name Fringilla petronia. It is now the only species in the genus Petronia that was introduced by the German naturalist Johann Jakob Kaup in 1829. Petronia is a local name for the rock sparrow from the Bologna area of Italy.

Seven subspecies are recognised:
 P. p. petronia (Linnaeus, 1766) – Madeira and Canary Islands, south Europe to west Turkey
 P. p. barbara Erlanger, 1899 – northwest Africa
 P. p. puteicola Festa, 1894 – south Turkey to Jordan
 P. p. exigua (Hellmayr, 1902) – central Turkey to the Caucasus, north Iran and north Iraq
 P. p. kirhizica Sushkin, 1925 – Caspian Sea to Kyrgyzstan
 P. p. intermedia Hartert, 1901 – Iran and north Afghanistan to northwest China
 P. p. brevirostris Taczanowski, 1874 – Mongolia, south central Siberia and north and central China

Some species have once been classified under Petronia, specifically from the related genus Gymnoris (Petronia superciliaris, Petronia dentata, Petronia xanthocollis) and Carpospiza (Petronia brachydactyla).

Description
The rock sparrow is similar in size to a house sparrow but with a larger more conical bill. It has a patterned brown back and wings, streaked underparts, and a diagnostic, but hard-to-see, yellow throat spot. Petronia petronia are monochromatic, with a distinctive yellow patch on their upper breast that starkly contrasts the earth tones of their plumage. This carotenoid-based trait is present in both sexes, and plays an important role during the breeding season, signalling both attractiveness and social status. This bird has a loud wheezy song.

Distribution and habitat
It is a rare vagrant north of its breeding range. There is just a single record from Great Britain, at Cley, Norfolk on 14 June 1981. This gregarious bird is also found in human settlements in suitable country.

Behaviour

Breeding
It nests in crevices in rocks or walls, laying four to five eggs. Rock sparrows exhibit a variety of mating patterns, most notably monogamy and sequential and simultaneous polyandry; however, social monogamy is the most abundant mating pattern. The frequencies of these various mating patterns most likely vary with numerous ecological and social factors. Many studies have shown that both males and females prefer a mate with a larger yellow patch. It has also been shown that male brood defence behaviours increase with greater female ornamentation. Males also differentially allocate parental investment according to female ornamentation; this behaviour is not observed in females. In alpine colonies of Petronia petronia, females perform most of the provisioning. In Asian colonies, both males and females contribute equally to the care of the young. Males of larger sizes feed their young at higher rates, which suggests that larger males occupy better territories and/or are better fathers. Studies have found a positive correlation between male yellow breast patch size and nestling tarsus length, which suggests that more ornamented males are also better parents. Females increase the number of non-feeding visits to their nest as the season progresses, suggesting that because females have lesser opportunities to lay other clutches, it is most advantageous to support the survival of their current offspring. A positive relationship between the number of deserting females and the number of available males has been recorded.

Food and feeding
The rock sparrow mainly forages on the ground. It eats seeds throughout the year and berries in autumn. In the spring its diet includes invertebrates, particularly caterpillars and grasshoppers. These are also fed to the young.

References

Sources

External links

Rock sparrow at Madeira Birds
Photos at Oiseaux
Ageing and sexing by Javier Blasco-Zumeta & Gerd-Michael Heinze (PDF; 1.1 MB)

rock sparrow
Birds of Eurasia
Birds of North Africa
Birds of Macaronesia
rock sparrow
rock sparrow